Astraeus pteridis is a species of false earthstar in the family Diplocystaceae. It was described by American mycologist Cornelius Lott Shear in 1902 under the name Scleroderma pteridis. Sanford Myron Zeller transferred it to Astraeus in a 1948 publication. It is found in North America. A. pteridis was previously frequently confused with the supposedly cosmopolitan A. hygrometricus, now shown to be found only in Europe.

Distribution 
A molecular phylogenetic study from 2013 resulted in the application of the name A. pteridis to the larger Astraeus found in the Pacific Northwest region of North America. A. pteridis has also been found in the Canary Islands, Madeira, and Argentina, which share historical connections to Lusitania. It may be widely distributed or have been translocated.

Morphology 
A. pteridis closely resembles A. hygrometricus, though it is larger, reaching 5 to 15 cm (2.0 to 5.9 in) or more when expanded, and often has a more pronounced areolate pattern on the inner surface of the rays. Within Astraeus, A. pteridis is most closely related to A. morganii. Like other Astraeus, it is hygroscopic, with rays expanding in humid conditions and closing in arid conditions. It is not typically considered edible.

References

External links

Boletales
Fungi described in 1902
Fungi of North America
Fungi of Macaronesia